Keith Williams  is a British businessman who has been chairman of Halfords and Royal Mail since 2018. He was chief executive officer (CEO) of British Airways from 2011 to 2016.

Early life
Williams was born on Teesside, England, and received an undergraduate degree from the University of Liverpool.

Career
Williams spent his early career with Boots, Apple Inc., and Reckitt and Colman.

In 1998, Williams left Reckitt and Colman, and joined British Airways, rising to CEO in 2011, and then chairman. In April 2016, he was succeeded by Álex Cruz as chairman.

Williams has been a non-executive director and deputy chairman of John Lewis, and a non-executive director of Aviva until May 2019.

Williams has been the chairman of Halfords since July 2018.

In May 2019, Williams, then deputy chairman, and a board member since January 2018, succeeded Les Owen as chairman of Royal Mail.

In May 2020, Rico Back resigned as CEO of Royal Mail with immediate effect, and Williams, the chairman, replaced him as executive chairman.

Williams is the independent chair of the Government-supported Rail Review.

Honours
In 2019, Williams was awarded an honorary doctorate by Teesside University. He was appointed Commander of the Order of the British Empire (CBE) in the 2022 Birthday Honours for services to the railway industry.

References

Living people
Year of birth missing (living people)
Alumni of the University of Liverpool
Royal Mail people
British chief executives
British airline chief executives
British Airways people
John Lewis Partnership people
Reckitt people
Apple Inc. employees
Aviva people
Walgreens people
Commanders of the Order of the British Empire